Lode Aerts (born 2 October 1959), identified also as Lodewijk Aerts, is a Belgian prelate of the Catholic Church who has been Bishop of Bruges since December 2016.

Biography
Lode Aerts is a native of Geraardsbergen, diocese of Ghent. He attended secondary school in Eeklo and entered the Diocesan Seminary in Ghent in 1977. He studied philosophy at the Katholieke Universiteit Leuven and Theology at the diocesan seminary. He was ordained priest on 7 July 1984 and in 1988 obtained a doctorate in theology at the Pontifical Gregorian University. He taught at the seminary in Ghent from 1988 to 2002, when he became a canon of St Bavo's Cathedral, Ghent, and the diocesan vicar for vocations. In the summer of 2016 he became dean of Ghent Cathedral.

On 5 October 2016, Pope Francis appointed him to succeed Jozef De Kesel as Bishop of Bruges. As his motto he chose Pretiosus In Oculis Suis (Precious in His eyes). He was consecrated on 4 December by Cardinal de Kesel, in the Cathedral of Saint Saviour.

Publications
Nieuwkomers bij de bron: Als de Kerk naar jongeren luistert (Halewijn, 2003); French translation: Quand l’Eglise écoute les jeunes (2004)
Drinken aan de bron: De smaak van het christelijk geloof (Halewijn, 2012).

References 

1959 births
Living people
People from Geraardsbergen
KU Leuven alumni
Pontifical Gregorian University alumni
Bishops of Bruges
21st-century Roman Catholic bishops in Belgium
Belgian expatriates in Italy